The Grand Couronné is a succession of inliers north and east of the French city of Nancy.

It is 30 km long and between 2 and 8 km wide. The highest point is 400 m.

The heights of the Grand Couronné played an important role during World War I in defending Nancy against the German Army.

Until 2017, 19 villages from Bouxières-aux-Chênes in the North-West, to Moncel-sur-Seille in the North-East, to Haraucourt in the South, formed the Communauté de communes du Grand Couronné.

References

See also 
 Battle of Grand Couronné

Geology of France
Geography of Meurthe-et-Moselle